Sandra Keller may refer to: 

Sandra Keller, birth name of Sultaana Freeman, American Muslim
Sandra Keller (actress), German actress